Zaplous is a genus of longhorn beetles of the subfamily Lamiinae, containing the following species:

Zaplous annulatus (Chevrolat, 1862)
Zaplous baracutey Zayas, 1975

References

Pogonocherini